Nir Bardea (born 25 January 1996) is an Israeli footballer who plays for Maccabi Bnei Reineh.

Career
On 8 July 2022 signed for Maccabi Bnei Reineh.

References

External links
 

1996 births
Footballers from Rishon LeZion
Living people
Israeli footballers
Israel under-21 international footballers
Association football defenders
Hapoel Ramat Gan F.C. players
F.C. Ashdod players
Budapest Honvéd FC players
Maccabi Bnei Reineh F.C. players
Israeli Premier League players
Liga Leumit players
Nemzeti Bajnokság I players
Israeli expatriate footballers
Expatriate footballers in Hungary
Israeli expatriate sportspeople in Hungary